Tarucus is a butterfly genus in the family Lycaenidae. They are commonly known as blue Pierrots or simply Pierrots. The latter name is often used for the closely related genus Castalius. The delimitation of Castalius versus Tarucus is not yet fully resolved, with some species, such as the dark Pierrot (T. ananda), having been moved between the two genera repeatedly. It may even be that they are eventually regarded as synonymous, and in that case the older name Castalius would supersede Tarucus by the Principle of Priority.

Several species formerly in Tarucus were moved to Leptotes, another closely related lineage (though not quite as close as Castalius).

The caterpillars of this genus typically feed on Zizyphus and are attended by ants.

Species
The genus can be divided in two distinct groups. These are generally separated geographically, but some taxa (such as the black-spotted Pierrot, T. balkanicus nigra), though assigned to one group, occur in the range of the other. Consequently, it is not quite clear whether the groups are clades or merely convenient but paraphyletic assemblages:

Afrotropical group:
 Tarucus balkanicus – Balkan Pierrot, little tiger blue
 Tarucus balkanicus nigra – black-spotted Pierrot
 Tarucus bowkeri (Trimen, 1883) – Bowker's blue
 Tarucus grammicus (Grose-Smith & Kirby, 1893) – black Pierrot
 Tarucus kiki Larsen, 1976 – Kiki's Pierrot
 Tarucus kulala Evans, 1955 – Turkana Pierrot
 Tarucus legrasi Stempffer, 1944 – Le Gras' Pierrot
 Tarucus quadratus Ogilvie-Grant, 1899
 Tarucus rosacea (Austaut, 1885) – Mediterranean tiger blue, Mediterranean Pierrot
 Tarucus sybaris (Hopffer, 1855) – Dotted blue
 Tarucus theophrastus – pointed Pierrot, African Pierrot, common tiger blue
 Tarucus thespis (Linnaeus, 1764) – Vivid blue
 Tarucus ungemachi Stempffer, 1944 – Ungemach's Pierrot

South Asian group:
 Tarucus ananda – dark Pierrot
 Tarucus callinara – spotted Pierrot
 Tarucus indica – Indian Pierrot
 Tarucus nara – striped Pierrot
 Tarucus venosus – veined Pierrot, Himalayan Pierrot
 Tarucus waterstradti Druce, 1895
 Tarucus waterstradti dharta – Assam Pierrot

Others:
 Tarucus alteratus
 Tarucus extricatus

Footnotes

References

  (2008): Tree of Life Web Project – Tarucus Moore 1881. The Blue Pierrots. Version of 19 May 2008. Retrieved 29 November 2009. 
  (2009): Markku Savela's Lepidoptera and some other life forms – Tarucus. Version of 15 August 2009. Retrieved 29 November 2009.
 Seitz, A. Die Gross-Schmetterlinge der Erde 13: Die Afrikanischen Tagfalter. Plate XIII 74 et prae

 
Lycaenidae genera